Jamie Moore (born 31 January 1985 in Brighton, East Sussex, England) is an English National Hunt jockey. He is the brother of Champion Jockey Ryan Moore, National Hunt jockey Joshua E Moore, amateur jockey Hayley Moore and son of successful dual-purpose trainer Gary L Moore.

As a 19-year-old Moore had a serious fall, crushing two vertebrae, at Newton Abbott races on 28 July 2004. On 12 April 2014, Moore rode the 40-1 Al Co to victory in the Scottish Grand National.

Major wins
 Great Britain
 Scottish Grand National - (1) - Al Co (2014)
 Queen Mother Champion Chase - (1) - Sire de Grugy (2014)
 Clarence House Chase - (1) - Sire de Grugy (2014)
 Tingle Creek Chase - (2) - Sire de Grugy (2013, 2015)
 Welsh Grand National - (1) - Mountainous (2015)

See also
List of jockeys

References

1985 births
English jockeys
Lester Award winners
Living people